XHCAL-FM is a radio station on 94.3 FM in Calpulalpan, Tlaxcala.

It is part of CORACYT, the radio and television organization of Tlaxcala, along with Tlaxcala Televisión as well as XETT-AM 1430 and XHTLAX-FM 96.5, both in Tlaxcala.

XHCAL was put on air by the state government in 1990 as part of a bid to promote Tlaxcalan identity among the residents of the northeast corner in the state.

References

Radio stations in Tlaxcala
Public radio in Mexico